Arthur Charles Lueder (March 12, 1876 – May 7, 1957) was an American lawyer businessman, and politician.

Born in Elmhurst, Illinois, Lueder served in the United States Army during the Spanish–American War. He graduated from Elmhurst College and from the University of Chicago Law School. He was a lawyer and was in the real estate business. In the spring of 1923 he ran for Mayor of Chicago Republican Party ticket. He soon after ran for Illinois Secretary of State, again on the Republican ticket. He served as postmaster of Chicago from 1921 to 1933 except for a brief interval in 1923. From 1941 to 1949, Lueder served as Illinois Auditor of Public Accounts, having been elected in 1940 and 1944. He died at his daughter's home in Lombard, Illinois after undergoing surgery.

Notes

1876 births
1957 deaths
Politicians from Chicago
People from Elmhurst, Illinois
Military personnel from Illinois
Elmhurst College alumni
University of Chicago Law School alumni
Businesspeople from Chicago
Illinois Republicans
Auditors of Public Accounts of Illinois
Postmasters of Chicago